Planchonella latihila is a species of plant in the family Sapotaceae. It is endemic to New Caledonia. As with other plants in the same genus, it possesses stamens that are located below (and rarely in) the tube orifice; a multi-seeded fruit, as well as foliaceous cotyledons embedded in endosperm.

References

Further reading
Méndez, Marcos, and Jérôme Munzinger. "Planchonella, first record of gynomonoecy for the family Sapotaceae." Plant Systematics and Evolution287.1-2 (2010): 65–73.
Munzinger, Jérôme, and Ulf Swenson. "Three new species of Planchonella Pierre (Sapotaceae) with a dichotomous and an online key to the genus in New Caledonia." Adansonia 31.1 (2009): 175–189.

External links

Endemic flora of New Caledonia
latihila